Technomyrmex difficilis, known generally as the white-footed ant or difficult techno ant, is a species of odorous ant in the family Formicidae.

Native to the Old World, adventive in North America since 1986.

References

Further reading

External links

 

Dolichoderinae
Insects described in 1892